Patrick "Pat" Tubach is a visual effects supervisor. Tubach and his fellow visual effects artists were nominated for an Academy Award for Best Visual Effects for the 2013 film Star Trek Into Darkness and the 2015 film Star Wars: The Force Awakens.
He also worked on the film WALL-E in 2008.

References

External links
 

Special effects coordinators
Living people
Year of birth missing (living people)